Jules-Félix Coutan (22 September 1848 – 23 February 1939) was a French sculptor and educator.

Life 
As a student at the École des Beaux-Arts, Coutan was awarded the Prix de Rome in 1872; after his return to Paris he executed the fountain group France Bearing the Torch of Civilization for the Exposition Universelle (1889), one of the two prominent sculptural commissions for the exposition grounds. Later he taught at the École des Beaux-Arts from 1900, where he expressed his disdain for the researches of Rodin (as ) and the Impressionist sculptors who followed him.  He was elected to the Académie des Beaux-Arts in 1905.

Coutan is best known in the United States for the sculptural group above the entrance to Grand Central Terminal in New York City.  For Grand Central Terminal, Coutan was contracted to provide a quarter-size scale plaster model of the three-figure allegorical Transportation group, which he developed from 1911 through 1914.  (Coutan never visited the U.S.)  The carving was performed by the William Bradley & Son of Long Island City.

The small bronzes, some stamped by the founders Thiebaut Frères, that represented a constant source of income for Coutan and a genre typical of his output, appear with some frequency on the art market.

Among Coutan's students were Hippolyte Lefèbvre, Raymond Delamarre, Louis-Eugène Tauzin, and the Argentine sculptor Rogelio Yrurtia.

Work

 fountain group France Bearing the Torch of Civilization for the Exposition Universelle (1889)
 caryatids for the Opéra-Comique, Paris, 1899
 reliefs Science and Labor for the Pont de Passy (now the Pont de Bir-Hakeim), Paris
 bas-reliefs for the polychrome terra-cotta facade in the Square Félix-Desruelles, with architect Charles Risler, for Sèvres Porcelain, circa 1900
 figure of La France de la Renaissance for the Pont Alexandre III, circa 1900
 high relief, The Eagle Hunters for the facade of the Muséum national d'histoire naturelle in Paris; also the plaster model at the Musée d'Orsay (1893–1900); bronze cast (1900), installed
 Glory of Commerce group for Grand Central Terminal, NYC, 1914
 the bust of Georges-Eugène Haussmann at the Père Lachaise Cemetery
 Franco-Prussian War Memorial, Poitiers
 angel figures for the José C. Paz tomb, La Recoleta Cemetery, Buenos Aires, Argentina

References

External links
 

1848 births
1939 deaths
French architectural sculptors
Prix de Rome for sculpture
Sculptors from Paris
Members of the Académie des beaux-arts
20th-century French sculptors
19th-century French sculptors
French male sculptors
19th-century French male artists